Chintalapadu is a village in NTR district of the Indian state of Andhra Pradesh. It is located in Chandarlapadu mandal of Vijayawada revenue division.
 It forms a part of Andhra Pradesh Capital Region.

References 

Villages in NTR district